Morgue is a Paraguayan thriller horror film directed and produced by Hugo Cardozo.

The film was released on August 22, 2019, being the most watched film of the week with 23,000 tickets sold.

Plot
The story is about private security guard Diego Martínez, who, while working the nightshift in the Regional Hospital of Encarnación, gets locked inside the morgue and experiences a series of haunting paranormal events.

According to the director and screenwriter, Hugo Cardozo, the film is based on real events.

Cast
 Pablo Martínez
 Willi Villalba
 Maria del Mar Fernández
 Abel Martínez
 Aldo Von Knobloch
 Raúl Rotela
 Francisco Ayala

Box office
Morgue opened to a first week box office selling 23,000 tickets in 36 theaters. It stayed at number one for two consecutive weeks.

References

External links
 
 

2019 films
2019 horror films
Paraguayan horror films
Films shot in Paraguay
Films set in Paraguay
2010s Spanish-language films
Guaraní-language films